Jacobs Creek is a  long 2nd order tributary to the Monongahela River in Fayette County, Pennsylvania.

Course
Jacobs Creek rises about 1.5 miles northwest of Shoaf, Pennsylvania, and then flows southwest to join the Monongahela River at Martin.

Watershed
Jacobs Creek drains  of area, receives about 42.9 in/year of precipitation, has a wetness index of 340.19, and is about 58% forested.

See also
List of rivers of Pennsylvania

References

Rivers of Pennsylvania
Rivers of Fayette County, Pennsylvania
Allegheny Plateau